Associação Amigos do Marreco Futsal, is a Brazilian futsal club from Francisco Beltrão founded in 2007 which plays in Liga Futsal.

Club honours

State competitions
 Taça Paraná de Futsal: 2011
 Chave Prata: 2008
 Jogos Abertos do Paraná Divisão A (2): 2011, 2015

Current squad

References

External links
 Marreco Futsal official website
 Marreco Futsal LNF profile
 Marreco Futsal in zerozero.pt

Futsal clubs established in 2007
2007 establishments in Brazil
Futsal clubs in Brazil
Sports teams in Paraná